The 2011–12 División de Honor Juvenil de Fútbol season is the 26th since its establishment. The regular season began in September 2011, and ended in April 2012.

Regular season

Group 1

Group 2

Group 3

Group 4

Group 5

Group 6

Group 7

Copa de Campeones

Bracket

Group A

1st round

2nd round

Group B

1st round

2nd round

Final

Details

See also
2012 Copa del Rey Juvenil

External links
Group 1 at futbolme.com
Group 2 at futbolme.com
Group 3 at futbolme.com
Group 4 at futbolme.com
Group 5 at futbolme.com
Group 6 at futbolme.com
Group 7 at futbolme.com

División de Honor Juvenil de Fútbol seasons
Juvenil